{{DISPLAYTITLE:C11H11NO2}}
The molecular formula C11H11NO2 (molar mass: 189.211 g/mol) may refer to:

 3-Indolepropionic acid (IPA), or indole-3-propionic acid
 Phensuximide

Molecular formulas